Events in the year 1810 in Mexico.

Incumbents 

 Francisco Javier de Lizana y Beaumont – viceroy of New Spain until May 8, also served as Archbishop of Mexico for all of 1810
 Francisco Javier Venegas – viceroy of New Spain after September 14

Events

 September 16 – Grito de Dolores: Miguel Hidalgo, a Catholic priest from Dolores, Guanajuato, incites the revolt that becomes Mexico's Independence War.
 September 28 – The door of the Alhóndiga de Granaditas is set on fire by El Pípila, allowing the Insurrection to take over the Spaniard's control of the building.
 October 30 – The Battle of Monte de las Cruces takes place in Ocoyoacac

Notable births

Dates unknown
 Guillermo Castro – soldier, rancher, and magistrate, was born near Coyote, Alta California

References

 
Mexico
Years of the 19th century in Mexico